Christine Healy (born June 13, 1950) is an American television and film actress. She has had recurring roles in television multiple series, including ER and The Days and Nights of Molly Dodd. Her film appearances include Like Father Like Son (1987), Voices Within: The Lives of Truddi Chase (1990) and Little Sister (1992).

Filmography

Film

Television

References

External links

1950 births
American film actresses
American television actresses
Living people
21st-century American women